The 1982 Monterrey Cup, also known as the Copa Monterrey, was a men's tennis tournament played on indoor carpet courts in Monterrey, Mexico. The event was part of the Super Series of the 1982 Volvo Grand Prix circuit. It was the fourth edition of the tournament and was held from February 22 through February 28, 1982. First-seeded Jimmy Connors won the singles title and earned $60,000 first-prize money.

Finals

Singles
 Jimmy Connors defeated  Johan Kriek 6–2, 3–6, 6–3
 It was Connors' 1st singles title of the year and the 90th of his career.

Doubles
 Hank Pfister /  Victor Amaya defeated  Tracy Delatte /  Mel Purcell 6–3, 6–7, 6–3

References

External links
 ITF tournament edition details

Monterrey
1982 in Mexican tennis
Monterrey WCT